Forbidden Warrior is a 2005 martial arts fantasy action film starring Marie Matiko, Sung Kang and Karl Yune. It was directed by Jimmy Nickerson, and produced by Glen Hartford and Daniel Toll.
The film is notable in resembling a low-budget Hong Kong action film, despite its American production and cast.  A review in Variety noted that characters from a Chinese myth are given Japanese names and played by caucasians.

In a 2006 interview, the writer/producer Glen Hartford claims he based the story on "a piece of mythological history, from over 4000 years ago", and calls the movie an "Asian film".

Cast
 Marie Matiko - Seki
 Sung Kang - Doran
 Karl Yune - Locust
 Tony Amendola - Ajis-Aka
 James Hong - Muraji, The Warlord
 Andrew Divoff - Ujis-Aka
 Musetta Vander - Reza
 Chris Coppola - Jibberish
 Bruce Locke - Miyamoto
 Kay E. Kuter - Yawn
 Ron Yuan - Lank
 Kristina Wayborn - Sorceress
 Vladimir Cuk - Tall Tall

References

 

2005 films
2005 action films
American action films
American martial arts films
2005 martial arts films
2000s English-language films
2000s American films